The Société Mathématique de France (SMF) is the main professional society of French mathematicians.

The society was founded in 1872 by Émile Lemoine and is one of the oldest mathematical societies in existence. It publishes several academic journals: Annales Scientifiques de l'École Normale Supérieure, Astérisque, Bulletin de la Société Mathématique de France, Gazette des mathématiciens, Mémoires de la Société Mathématique de France, Panoramas et Synthèses, and Revue d'histoire des mathématiques.

List of presidents 

1873: Michel Chasles
1874: Laffon de Ladebat
1875: Irénée-Jules Bienaymé
1876: Jules de La Gournerie (1814–1883)
1877: Amédée Mannheim
1878: Jean Gaston Darboux
1879: Pierre Ossian Bonnet
1880: Camille Jordan
1881: Edmond Laguerre
1882: Georges Henri Halphen
1883: Eugène Rouché
1884: Emile Picard
1885: Paul Appell
1886: Henri Poincaré
1887: Georges Fouret
1888: Charles-Ange Laisant
1889: Désiré André
1890: Julien Haton de La Goupillière
1891: Édouard Collignon
1892: Eugène Vicaire
1893: Georges Humbert
1894: Henry Picquet
1895: Edouard Goursat
1896: Gabriel Koenigs
1897: Emile Picard
1898: Léon Lecornu
1899: Emile Guyou (1843–1915)
1900: Henri Poincaré
1901: Maurice d’Ocagne
1902: Louis Raffy
1903: Paul Painlevé
1904: Emmanuel Carvallo
1905: Émile Borel
1906: Jacques Hadamard
1907: Emile Blutel
1908: Raoul Perrin
1909: Charles Bioche
1910: Raoul Bricard
1911: Lucien Lévy
1912: Marie Henri Andoyer
1913: François Cosserat
1914: Ernest Vessiot
1915: Élie Cartan
1916: Maurice Fouché
1917: Claude Guichard
1918: Edmond Maillet
1919: Henri Lebesgue
1920: Jules Drach
1921: Auguste Boulanger
1922: Eugène Cahen
1923: Paul Appell
1924: Paul Lévy
1925: Paul Montel
1926: Pierre Fatou
1927: Bertrand de Defontviolant
1928: Alexandre Thybaut
1929: André Auric
1930: Émile Jouguet
1931: Arnaud Denjoy
1932: Gaston Julia
1933: Alfred-Marie Liénard
1934: Jean Chazy
1935: Maurice Fréchet
1936: René Garnier
1937: Joseph Pérès
1938: Georges Valiron
1939: Henri Vergne
1940: ?
1941: Théophile Got
1942: Charles Platrier
1943: Bertrand Gambier
1944: Jacques Chapelon
1945: Georges Darmois
1946: Jean Favard
1947: Albert Châtelet
1948: Maurice Janet
1949: Roger Brard
1950: Henri Cartan
1951: André Lamothe
1952: Marie-Louise Dubreil-Jacotin
1953: Szolem Mandelbrojt
1954: Jean Leray
1955: André Marchaud
1956: Maurice Roy
1957: André Marchaud
1958: Paul Dubreil
1959: André Lichnerowicz
1960: Marcel Brelot
1961: Gustave Choquet
1962: Laurent Schwartz
1963: Pierre Lelong
1964: Jean Dieudonné
1965: Charles Ehresmann
1966: André Revuz
1967: Georges Reeb
1968: René Thom
1969: Charles Pisot
1970: Jean-Pierre Serre
1971: Jean Cerf
1972–1973: Jean-Pierre Kahane
1974: Georges Poitou
1975: Yvette Amice
1976: Claude Godbillon
1977: Jacques Neveu
1978: Jean-Louis Koszul
1979–1980: Marcel Berger
1981: Michel Hervé
1982–1983: Christian Houzel
1984: Jean-Louis Verdier
1985: Bernard Malgrange
1986–1987: Jean-François Méla
1988: Michel Demazure
1989: Gérard Schiffmann
1990–1992: Jean-Pierre Bourguignon
1992–1994: Daniel Barlet
1994–1996: Rémy Langevin
1996–1998: Jean-Jacques Risler
1998–2001: Mireille Martin-Deschamps
2001–2004: Michel Waldschmidt
2004–2007: Marie-Françoise Roy
2007–2010: Stéphane Jaffard
2010–2012: Bernard Helffer
2012–2013: Aline Bonami
2013–2016: Marc Peigné
2016–2019: Stéphane Seuret
2020– : Fabien Durand

See also 
European Mathematical Society
Centre International de Rencontres Mathématiques
List of mathematical societies

References

External links
Webpage of the society

Mathematical societies
Mathematics in France
Science and technology in France
1872 establishments in France